"Catch Me in the Air" is a song by Japanese-British singer-songwriter Rina Sawayama. It was released on 27 June 2022 as the second single from Sawayama's second studio album Hold the Girl.

Background and release 
"Catch Me in the Air" was debuted at SWG3 in Glasgow, Scotland in November 2021 during Sawayama's debut album tour as a teaser for her yet-to-be-announced second album. 
The album, Hold the Girl, was announced in May 2022, with a release date of 2 September 2022. The lead single, "This Hell", was followed by "Catch Me in the Air" in June 2022. In an interview with Zane Lowe, Sawayama noted that "Catch Me in the Air" was inspired by the music of Gwen Stefani.

Composition 
"Catch Me in the Air" is a "light and frothy" pop-rock song with a chorus that was described as having a "bouncy melody". The aforementioned chorus faces a key change, added for a "lifting" effect. The song is a tribute to her mother, who raised Sawayama as a single parent. It was written during the pandemic.
When Sawayama debuted the song during the Sawayama tour at Glasgow's SWG3, she told the crowd: “I wrote this song because, in these unprecedented times, I am touring my first record at the same time as finishing my second record. I thought that the first record was really personal – and it was – but this new record is even more personal. This song, I wrote it about my mum, who is a single mum. You know how intense that relationship is – they feel like a sister or a brother. I felt throughout my life that my mum and I have caught each other when we’re falling.”

Critical reception 
Tyler Golsen of Far Out gave "Catch Me in the Air" a score of six out of ten, noting that the track was not "up to the genre-bending peaks that Sawayama is normally capable of", though he noted that the song was difficult "not to enjoy".

Credits 
 Rina Sawayama – performer, songwriter
 Stuart Price – songwriter, producer
 Clarence Clarity – producer
 Grace Barker – songwriter
 Oscar Scheller – songwriter
 Adam Crisp – songwriter

Charts

References 

2022 singles
2022 songs
Pop rock songs
Rina Sawayama songs
Songs written by Stuart Price
Song recordings produced by Stuart Price
Songs written by Rina Sawayama